San Bernardino is a residential neighbourhood of the Venezuelan municipality Libertador of Caracas, and one of its 32 parishes.

Although it is mostly a middle class residential neighbourhood, San Bernardino holds some of the most important Venezuelan hospitals and some enterprises within its territory like the headquarters of one of the biggest banks of the country Banco Mercantil, the headquarters of Banco Venezolano de Crédito, Corpoelec the fully integrated state power corporation of Venezuela and the Centro Financiero Confinanzas.

In this district it's also located one of the most important museums of Caracas, the Museum of Colonial Art "La Quinta de Anauco".

Neighbourhoods of Caracas
Parishes of Capital District (Venezuela)